Yellowstone Kelly is a 1959 American Western film based upon a novel by Heck Allen (using his pen name Clay Fisher, which shows in the film credits) with a screenplay by Burt Kennedy starring Clint Walker as Luther Sage "Yellowstone" Kelly, and directed by Gordon Douglas. The film was originally supposed to be directed by John Ford with John Wayne in the Clint Walker role but Ford and Wayne opted to make The Horse Soldiers instead.

At the time the film was notable for using the leads of then popular Warner Bros. Television shows, Cheyenne (Walker), Lawman (John Russell),  77 Sunset Strip (Edd "Kookie" Byrnes), and The Alaskans (Ray Danton) as well as Warners contract stars such as Andra Martin, Claude Akins, Rhodes Reason and Gary Vinson.

The novel was based on the real life Luther Kelly.

Plot
 
Trapper Yellowstone Kelly and his partner Anse Harper come upon the sick Arapaho Wahleeh. Wahleeh is a captive of Sioux Chief Gall and is desired by both Gall and his nephew Sayapi. Kelly keeps Wahleeh to cure her and promises to return her to Gall when spring comes. However Sayapi vows to take Wahleeh back and kill Kelly. As winter ends Wahleeh has recovered and wishes to return to her people and not be returned to Gall or Sayapi. She finds herself falling in love with Kelly, But Sayapi attacks Kelly's cabin while he is trapping, injuring Harper and taking Wahleeh away. When Kelly returns he finds his cabin burning and Harper alive but succumbing to his wounds. He tells Kelly that Sayapi has taken Wahleeh before his death. Kelly tracks down Sayapi band engaging in a gun fight that kills Sayapi and his band. Kelly intends to keep his word and return Wahleeh to Gall despite his feelings for Wahleeh, but they come across a Cavalry troop that has been attacked by Gall. Gall and his warriors return to attack the troop. Before the attack Gall confronts Kelly telling him he can leave in peace if he gives up Wahleeh., but the troops must remain to be slaughtered. Kelly will not give up Wahleeh if it means the deaths of the soldiers. Gall's warriors mount the first attack killing many of the troops. All seems lost as Gall prepares for his second attack, when Wahleeh rides out to Gall in an attempt to save Kelly. Wahleeh is injured when her horse overturns, Kelly and Gall race to her side. Kelly clearly showing his feelings for Wahleeh tells Gall to end the battle so more don't have to feel as they do. Gall agrees and leaves with his warriors. Some time later Kelly and Whaleeh are seen taking Kelly's fur pelts to a Riverboat for delivery.

Cast
 Clint Walker as Luther "Yellowstone" Kelly
 Edd Byrnes as Anse Harper
 John Russell as Gall, Sioux Chief
 Ray Danton as Sayapi, Gall's nephew 
 Claude Akins as Sergeant
 Rhodes Reason as Major Towns
 Andra Martin as Wahleeah, Sayapi's Arapaho captive
 Gary Vinson as Lieutenant
 Warren Oates as Corporal

Production
Warner Bros announced the project in August 1956 saying that John Wayne would star. It was based on a novel by Clay Fisher, not published until April 1957. When the novel came out the New York Times said it "rates grade A without question".

D.D. Beauchamp was hired to write a script. Then Eliot Asinof was reported as working on the script. Jack Warner assigned Irving Shermer as producer.

By early 1959 the project had become a vehicle for Clint Walker, the star of Warner Bros' hit TV show Cheyenne and the final script was done by Burt Kennedy who was under contract to Warners at the time.

Walker's co-star was Edd Byrnes who had leapt to fame playing "Kookie" on the Warner Bros detective show 77 Sunset Strip.

Filming took place in April and June 1959, partly on location in Flagstaff, Arizona. "I felt miserable and lost ten pounds in one month" said Byrnes. Ray Danton was signed to a long-term contract at Warners after the film.

Reception
The Los Angeles Times called the film "fairly good" in which Byrnes was "a bit too contemporary. Let it be said that he left his comb somewhere in the Sunset Strip and played it straight from there. Burt Kennedy's script is first rate."

According to Kinematograph Weekly the film performed "better than average" at the British box office in 1959.

Comic book adaptation
 Dell Four Color #1056 (October 1959) Drawn by Dan Spiegle

See also

 List of American films of 1959

References

External links
 
 
 
 

1959 films
1959 Western (genre) films
American Western (genre) films
1950s English-language films
Films directed by Gordon Douglas
Films based on American novels
Films based on Western (genre) novels
Films adapted into comics
Films based on works by Henry Wilson Allen
Films shot in Arizona
1950s American films